James Garrett Freeman (November 12, 1980 – January 27, 2016) was an American man who was convicted, sentenced to death, and executed for murder in Texas.

Freeman originated from Lissie, an unincorporated area in Wharton County, Texas. He was a welder, but was unemployed at the time he committed murder. He had no record of violence. On March 17, 2007 Freeman engaged in a high-speed chase with Texas Parks and Wildlife Department (TPWD) officers. At the Lissie Cemetery, where the chase ended, he fired at TPWD staff with an AK-47 and a Glock pistol. Justin Hurst, a 34-year old TPWD game warden, was struck twice and killed. Hurst had turned 34 that day. Freeman was shot four times and survived.

Freeman, Texas Department of Criminal Justice (TDCJ)#999539, was convicted and sentenced to death. While on death row he was in Polunsky Unit. He was executed at Huntsville Unit on January 27, 2016, nine years after the murder.

The Justin Hurst Wildlife Management Area (WMA) of the TPWD, located in Brazoria County, Texas, was renamed after the victim in 2007. It was formerly the Peach Point WMA.

See also
 Capital punishment in Texas
 List of people executed in Texas, 2010–2019
 List of people executed in the United States in 2016

References

External links
Texas Courts: Indictment, Conviction, and Sentencing
"IN THE COURT OF CRIMINAL APPEALS OF TEXAS NO. AP-76,052 JAMES GARRETT FREEMAN, Appellant v. THE STATE OF TEXAS ON DIRECT APPEAL FROM CAUSE NO. 15987 IN THE 329TH JUDICIAL DISTRICT COURT WHARTON COUNTY"

1980 births
2016 deaths
2007 murders in the United States
American people executed for murdering police officers
Wharton County, Texas
21st-century executions by Texas
21st-century executions of American people
People executed by Texas by lethal injection
People convicted of murder by Texas
American male criminals